Disincanto is the twelfth studio album by Italian singer Mango. It features the singles "Disincanto" and "La rondine", and a cover of the Beatles' song "Michelle".

The album has sold 250,000 copies.

Track listing

Peak positions

Personnel
Mango - lead vocals, keyboards
Graziano Accinni - guitars
Gigi de Rienzo - guitars
Rocco Petruzzi - keyboards
Giancarlo Ippolito - drums
Pasquale Laino - duduk on "Disincanto"
Gilda Buttà - piano on "Gli angeli non volano"
Luca Pincini - cello on "Gli angeli non volano"

References 

Mango albums
2002 albums